was a Japanese football player. He played for Japan national team.

Club career
Okada was born in Kobe on August 11, 1926. He played for Kwangaku Club and Rokko Club.

National team career
In March 1951, Okada was selected Japan national team for Japan team first game after World War II, 1951 Asian Games. At this competition, on March 7, he debuted against Iran. He also played at 1954 Asian Games. He played 7 games for Japan until 1954.

On June 22, 2002, Okada died of heart failure in Hachioji at the age of 75.

National team statistics

Honours
Japan
Asian Games Bronze medal: 1951

References

External links
 
 Japan National Football Team Database

1926 births
2002 deaths
Waseda University alumni
Association football people from Hyōgo Prefecture
Japanese footballers
Japan international footballers
Asian Games medalists in football
Asian Games bronze medalists for Japan
Footballers at the 1951 Asian Games
Medalists at the 1951 Asian Games
Footballers at the 1954 Asian Games
Association football defenders